Armed Forces of the Russian Federation Flight 9064 was a military flight from Bratsk Airport to Petropavlovsk-Kamchatsky Airport with 9 passengers and 9 crew aboard. The flight crashed at Novaya Inya, Russia on 1 December 2001, after a reported wing fire. All aboard perished.

Aircraft
The aircraft was an Ilyushin Il-76TD operated by the Border Guard Service of Russia for the Armed Forces of the Russian Federation that had been operated by Aeroflot to carry cargo. The aircraft's registration number was RA-76839.

Crash
As Flight 9064 was at 29,000 feet, a small fire started on the right wing of the aircraft. The flight crew declared intentions to perform an emergency landing. As the pilots tried to land, though, the fire grew worse. The plane descended rapidly and ended up hitting trees, causing it to break into multiple pieces as it crashed. The accident killed all 18 passengers and crew.

References

Accident description from 10001crash.com
Photographs of RA-76839
Accident description from the Flight Safety Foundation

Aviation accidents and incidents in 2001
Accidents and incidents involving the Ilyushin Il-76
Aviation accidents and incidents in Russia
Aviation accidents and incidents caused by in-flight fires
2001 disasters in Russia
December 2001 events in Russia